Leonard "Lenny" White III (born December 19, 1949) is an American jazz fusion drummer who was a member of the band Return to Forever led by Chick Corea in the 1970s. White has been called "one of the founding fathers of jazz fusion". He has won three Grammy awards, two nominations and one Latin Grammy.

Early life and education
Born in Queens, New York City, White became interested in music at a young age. As a self taught drummer he started off his career playing with groups at the New York jazz scene. While he was living at home, his father would take him to gigs. Early on he played clubs in Queens New York such as the Aphrodisiac, Slugs, and The Gold Lounge. It was at The Gold Lounge where he had his first gig with saxophonist Jackie McLean. During the late 1960s he began performing with Mclean around Queens. Through this, White was recommended to play on Miles Davis' landmark 1969 LP Bitches Brew and feature on Freddie Hubbard's 1970 LP Red Clay. Within 1972 White joined the jazz group Return to Forever.

Career

In 1975 White released his debut solo album entitled ‘’Venusian Summer,’’which featured guitarists Al DiMeola and fusion guitar pioneer, Larry Coryell. Big City was released in 1977. During 1978 he released his Space opera inspired The Adventures of Astral Pirates and his third solo album Streamline. He eventually formed the jazz/soul group Twennynine who went on to issue three studio albums, 1979's Best of Friends, Twennynine with Lenny White in 1980, and 1981's Just Like Dreamin.

White then made a guest appearance on Chick Corea's 1982 album Touchstone and produced Chaka Khan's 1982 LP Echoes of an Era. He later released his 1983 album Attitude and co-produced Pieces of a Dream's 1986 LP Joyride. White now teaches at NYU Steinhardt where he has an ensemble as well as a lecture class on Bitches Brew called “The Miles Davis Aesthetic.”

Personal life
White has been a longtime resident of Teaneck, New Jersey. He endorses Vic Firth drum sticks and only plays his own signature epoch cymbals sponsored by Istanbul Agop.

Awards and honorsGrammy AwardsWhite has been nominated for five Grammy Awards, of which he has won three. The Grammy Award is an award presented by The Recording Academy to recognize achievement in the mainly English-language music industry.

|-
! scope="row" | 1975
| No Mystery
| Best Jazz Performance by a group
| 
|-
! scope="row" | 2010
| The Stanley Clarke Band
| Best Contemporary Jazz Album
| 
|-
! scope="row" | 2011
| Forever
| Best Jazz Instrumental Album
| 

Discography
As leader/co-leader
 Venusian Summer (Nemperor, 1975)
 Big City (Nemperor, 1977)
 The Adventures of Astral Pirates (Elektra, 1978)
 Streamline (Elektra, 1978)
 Best of Friends (Elektra, 1979) - with Twennynine
 Twennynine with Lenny White (Elektra, 1980)
 Just Like Dreamin'  (With the Twennynine) (Elektra, 1981) - with Twennynine
 Attitude (Wounded Bird, 1983)
 In Clinic (DCI, 1983)
 Present Tense (Hip Bop, 1995)
 Renderers of Spirit (Hip Bop Essence, 1996)
 Edge (Hip Bop, 1998)
 Collection (Hip Bop, 2002)
 The Love Has Never Gone: Tribute to Earth, Wind & Fire (Trauma, 2004)
 Hancock Island (Chesky, 2008)
 Anomaly (Abstract Logix, 2010)
 Lenny White Live (BFM Jazz, 2013)

As Return to Forever
With Chick Corea, Bill Connors and Stanley Clarke
 Hymn of the Seventh Galaxy (Polydor, 1973)

With Chick Corea, Al Di Meola and Stanley Clarke
 Where Have I Known You Before (Polydor, 1974)
No Mystery (Polydor, 1975)
 Romantic Warrior (Columbia, 1976)
 Returns (Eagle, 2009)

As Corea, Clarke & White
 Forever  (Concord, 2009)

With Chick Corea, Stanley Clarke, Jean-Luc Ponty, Frank Gambale
 The Mothership Returns (Eagle, 2012)

As producer
Sylvia St. James – Magic (Elektra, 1981)
Chaka Khan – Echoes of an Era (Elektra, 1982)
Tina Harris – I must not be kinky (Shanachie, 1985)
Nicki Richards – Naked (To the World) (Elektra, 1991)
Letizia Gambi - Introducing Letizia Gambi (Jando Music / Via Veneto Jazz, 2012)
Letizia Gambi - Blue Monday (RP / IYOUWE, 2016)

 As sideman With Geri Allen Some Aspects of Water (Storyville, 1997)
 The Gathering (Verve, 1998)With Azteca Azteca (Columbia, 1972)
 Pyramid of the Moon (Columbia, 1973)
 From The Ruins (Inakustic Gmbh, 2008)With Cyrus Chestnut Natural Essence (HighNote, 2016)
 There's a Sweet, Sweet Spirit (HighNote, 2017)With Stanley Clarke Children of Forever (Polydor, 1973)
 Journey to Love (Nemperor, 1975)
 The Stanley Clarke Trio, Jazz in the Garden (Heads Up, 2009)With Larry Coryell & Victor Bailey Electric (Chesky, 2005)
 Traffic (Chesky, 2006)With Letizia Gambi Introducing Letizia Gambi (2012)(Jando Music/Via Veneto Jazz)
 Blue Monday (RP / IYOUWE, 2016)With Chaka Khan, Freddie Hubbard, Joe Henderson, Chick Corea & Stanley Clarke Echoes of an Era (Elektra, 1982)
 Echoes of an Era 2 – The Concert (Elektra, 1982)With Al Di Meola Land of the Midnight Sun (Columbia, 1976)
 Elegant Gypsy (Columbia, 1977)With Wallace RoneyVillage (Warner Bros., 1997)
No Room for Argument (Stretch, 2000)
A Place in Time (HighNote, 2016)With Buster Williams Houdini (Sirocco, 2001) – rec. 2000
 Griot Libertè (HighNote, 2004)
 65 Roses (BluePort Jazz, 2008) – rec. 2006With others'''
 1969: Andrew Hill, Passing Ships (Blue Note, 2003)
 1969: Miles Davis, Bitches Brew (Columbia, 1970)[2LP]
 1970: Joe Henderson, If You're Not Part of the Solution, You're Part of the Problem (Milestone, 1970) – live
 1970: Freddie Hubbard, Red Clay (CTI, 1970)
 1970: Woody Shaw, Blackstone Legacy (Contemporary, 1971)
 1971: Gato Barbieri, Fenix (Flying Dutchman, 1971)
 1972: Buddy Terry, Pure Dynamite (Mainstream, 1972)
 1972: Santana, Caravanserai (Columbia, 1972)
 1973: Curtis Fuller, Crankin' (Mainstream, 1973)
 1973: Eddie Henderson, Realization (Capricorn, 1973)
 1975: Jaco Pastorius, Jaco Pastorius (Epic, 1976)
 1976: Don Cherry, Hear & Now (Atlantic, 1977)
 1977?: Brian Auger's Oblivion Express, Happiness Heartaches  (Warner Bros., 1977)
 1986: Eliane Elias, Illusions (Denon, 1986)
 1989: The Manhattan Project, The Manhattan Project (Blue Note, 1990)
 1989?: Michel Petrucciani, Music (Blue Note, 1989)
 1993: Bobby Hutcherson, Acoustic Masters II (Atlantic, 1994)
 1994: Marcus Miller and Michel Petrucciani, Dreyfus Night in Paris (Dreyfus Jazz, 2003) – live
 1994?: Urbanator, Urbanator (Hip Bop, 1994)
 1999?: Vertú, Vertú (Sony, 1999)
 2001: Ron Carter, Stardust (Somethin' Else, 2001)
 2008?: , Batucada: Jazz'n Bossa (B.J.L., 2008)
 2010: Jamey Haddad, Explorations in Space and Time (Chesky, 2013)
 2011: Chick Corea, The Musician (Stretch, 2016)[3CD]
 2021?: Kenny Garrett, Sounds From The Ancestors'' (Mack Avenue, 2021)

References

External links
Lenny White video interview at All About Jazz
Return to Forever: Twelve Historic Tracks at Jazz.com
Lenny White biography at MusicTaste

1949 births
Living people
American jazz drummers
American funk drummers
American male drummers
Return to Forever members
Latin Grammy Award winners
American session musicians
Chesky Records artists
Elektra Records artists
People from Queens, New York
People from Teaneck, New Jersey
African-American jazz musicians
20th-century American drummers
20th-century American male musicians
American male jazz musicians
Vertú members
Jamaica Boys members
Jazz fusion drummers
Jazz musicians from New York (state)
20th-century African-American musicians
21st-century African-American people
American jazz composers